The Prayer Box is a faith-based film, released in 2018 by Pure Flix.  The film was directed by Kevan Otto, and stars Denise Richards, and Reginald VelJohnson.

Production
Principal photography started in December 2017, while filming took place from December 4–20, 2017 in various areas in and around Brownsville and Edmonson County, Kentucky.

Reception
"The ending feels a bit rushed, wrapping things up in the last ten minutes."

References

External links
Official trailer

2018 films
Films shot in Kentucky